The Griffin Poetry Prize is Canada's most generous poetry award. It was founded in 2000 by businessman and philanthropist Scott Griffin.

Before 2022, the awards went to one Canadian and one international poet who writes in the English language. In 2022, the two awards were consolidated into a single international prize of CAD$130,000. Shortlisted poets are awarded CAD$10,000, and a Lifetime Recognition Award comes with an award of CAD$25,000.

History
In April 2000, Scott Griffin started the Griffin Trust to raise public awareness of the crucial role poetry plays in society's cultural life. Griffin served as its Chairman, with Trustees Margaret Atwood, Robert Hass, Michael Ondaatje, Robin Robertson and David Young. In June 2004, Carolyn Forché joined the board of Trustees. New trustees have been named as follows: in 2014, Karen Solie, Colm Tóibín and Mark Doty, in 2016, Jo Shapcott and Marek Kazmierski, in 2018, Ian Williams and in 2020, Sarah Howe. Margaret Atwood, Robert Hass, Michael Ondaatje, Robin Robertson, Jo Shapcott and Colm Tóibín have assumed the role of Trustees Emeriti.

The Trust created the Griffin Poetry Prize with the aim of helping to introduce contemporary collections of poetry to the public's imagination. Originally, the award was two annual prizes of CAD$40,000 each, for collections of poetry published in English during the preceding year. One prize for a living Canadian poet, the other to a living poet from any other country, which could include Canada. Qualified judges are selected annually by the Trustees. The prize shortlists are announced in April (National Poetry Month) every year. The shortlisted poets gather for an evening of public readings every May/June, and the winners are announced and all the poets are feted the following evening.

Each year, selections from the shortlisted works are gathered in The Griffin Poetry Prize Anthology, typically edited by one of that year's judges. In 2019, House of Anansi Press partnered with the National Network for Equitable Library Services (NNELS) to offer the anthology in print and digital Braille editions. 
 
Eligible collections of poetry must have been published between January 1 and December 31 of the prior year. Submissions must come from publishers only.

Effective 2010, the annual Griffin Poetry Prize was doubled from CAD$100,000 to CAD$200,000 in recognition of the prize’s tenth anniversary. The increased amount of $100,000 will be awarded as follows: CAD$10,000 to each of the seven shortlisted – four international and three Canadian – for their participation in the shortlist readings. The winners, announced at the Griffin Poetry Prize Awards evening, will be awarded CAD$65,000 each, for a total of CAD$75,000 that includes the CAD$10,000 awarded at the readings the previous evening.

In November 2010, Scott Griffin announced a new Griffin Trust initiative called Poetry In Voice/Les voix de la poésie, a bilingual recitation contest for high school students across Canada.

The Griffin Trust has championed other initiatives since its inception, including a statue in tribute to poet Al Purdy, participation in international poetry festivals, and donations of poetry books to various organizations, including the Correctional Service of Canada, Scottish Poetry Library, Slave Lake Public Library (which was destroyed in a wildfire in 2011) and other libraries, schools and colleges.

Griffin Poetry Prize officials announced in 2022 that the Canadian and international awards would be consolidated into a single award of CAD$130,000. Founder Scott Griffin, who originally believed that Canadian poets needed a separate category, said that "now that a lot of Canadians have been recognized in the poetry world, we felt it was time they had to compete on the international stage with everybody else". An award of CAD$10,000 for a debut work of Canadian poetry was also announced.

Finalists, judges and Lifetime Recognition recipients
Winners are listed first and highlighted with bold.

2001
Canada:
Anne Carson, Men in the Off Hours
Robert Bringhurst, Nine Visits to the Mythworld
Don McKay, Another Gravity

International:
Nikolai Popov and Heather McHugh, translation of Glottal Stop: 101 Poems from the German written by Paul Celan
Chana Bloch and Chana Kronfeld, translation of Open Closed Open from the Hebrew written by Yehuda Amichai
Fanny Howe, Selected Poems
Les Murray, Learning Human

Judges:
Carolyn Forché
Dennis Lee
Paul Muldoon

Guest performer at awards ceremony: Gord Downie

2002
Canada:
Christian Bök, Eunoia
Erín Moure, Sheep's Vigil by a Fervent Person
Karen Solie, Short Haul Engine

International:
Alice Notley, Disobedience
Victor Hernández Cruz, Maraca
Christopher Logue, Homer: War Music
Les Murray, Conscious and Verbal

Judges:
Dionne Brand
Robert Creeley
Michael Hofmann

Guest host at awards ceremony: Albert Schultz

2003
Canada:
Margaret Avison, Concrete and Wild Carrot
Dionne Brand, thirsty
P. K. Page, Planet Earth: Poems Selected and New

International:
Paul Muldoon, Moy Sand and Gravel
Kathleen Jamie, Mr And Mrs Scotland are Dead: Poems 1980–1994
Gerald Stern, American Sonnets: poems
C. D. Wright, Steal Away: selected and new poems

Judges:
Michael Longley
Sharon Olds
Sharon Thesen

Guest speaker at awards ceremony: Heather McHugh

2004
Canada:
Anne Simpson, Loop
Di Brandt, Now You Care
Leslie Greentree, go-go dancing for Elvis

International:
August Kleinzahler, The Strange Hours Travelers Keep
Suji Kwock Kim, Notes From the Divided Country
David Kirby, The Ha-Ha
Louis Simpson, The Owner of the House

Judges:
Billy Collins
Bill Manhire
Phyllis Webb

2005
Canada:
Roo Borson, Short Journey Upriver Toward Oishida
George Bowering, Changing on the Fly
Don McKay, Camber

International:
Charles Simic, Selected Poems: 1963–2003
Fanny Howe, On the Ground
Michael Symmons Roberts, Corpus
Matthew Rohrer, A Green Light

Judges:
Simon Armitage
Erín Moure
Tomaž Šalamun

Guest speaker at awards ceremony: August Kleinzahler

2006
Canada:
Sylvia Legris, Nerve Squall
Phil Hall, An Oak Hunch
Erín Moure, Little theatres

International:
Kamau Brathwaite, Born to Slow Horses
Michael Hofmann, translation of Ashes for Breakfast: Selected Poems from the German written by Durs Grünbein
Michael Palmer, Company of Moths
Elizabeth Winslow, translation of The War Works Hard by Dunya Mikhail

Judges:
Lavinia Greenlaw
Lisa Robertson
Eliot Weinberger

Lifetime Recognition Award (presented by the Griffin trustees) to Robin Blaser

Guest speaker at awards ceremony: Simon Armitage

2007
Canada:
Don McKay, Strike/Slip
Ken Babstock, Airstream Land Yacht
Priscila Uppal, Ontological Necessities

International:
Charles Wright, Scar Tissue
Paul Farley, Tramp in Flames
Rodney Jones, Salvation Blues
Frederick Seidel, Ooga-Booga

Judges:
John Burnside
Charles Simic
Karen Solie

Lifetime Recognition Award (presented by the Griffin trustees) to Tomas Tranströmer

Guest speaker at awards ceremony: Matthew Rohrer

2008
Canada:
Robin Blaser, The Holy Forest: Collected Poems of Robin Blaser
Robert Majzels and Erín Moure, translation of Notebook of Roses and Civilization from the French written by Nicole Brossard
David McFadden, Why Are You So Sad? Selected Poems of David W. McFadden

International:
John Ashbery, Notes from the Air: Selected Later Poems
Elaine Equi, Ripple Effect: New and Selected Poems
Clayton Eshleman, translation of The Complete Poetry: A Bilingual Edition from the Spanish written by Cesar Vallejo
David Harsent, Selected Poems 1969–2005

Judges:
George Bowering
James Lasdun
Pura López Colomé

Lifetime Recognition Award (presented by the Griffin trustees) to Ko Un

Guest speaker at awards ceremony: Paul Farley

2009
Canada:
A. F. Moritz, The Sentinel
Kevin Connolly, Revolver
Jeramy Dodds, Crabwise to the Hounds

International:
C.D. Wright, Rising, Falling, Hovering
Mick Imlah, The Lost Leader
Derek Mahon, Life on Earth
Dean Young, Primitive Mentor

Judges:
Saskia Hamilton
Dennis O'Driscoll
Michael Redhill

Lifetime Recognition Award (presented by the Griffin trustees) to Hans Magnus Enzensberger

Guest speaker at awards ceremony: James Wood

2010
Canada:
Karen Solie, Pigeon
Kate Hall, The Certainty Dream
P. K. Page, Coal and Roses

International:
Eilean Ni Chuilleanain, The Sun-fish
John Glenday, Grain
Louise Gluck, A Village Life
Susan Wicks, translation of Cold Spring in Winter from the French written by Valérie Rouzeau

Judges:
Anne Carson
Kathleen Jamie
Carl Phillips

Lifetime Recognition Award (presented by the Griffin trustees) to Adrienne Rich

Guest speaker at awards ceremony: Glyn Maxwell

2011
Canada:
Dionne Brand, Ossuaries
Suzanne Buffam, The Irrationalist
John Steffler, Lookout

International:
Gjertrud Schnackenberg, Heavenly Questions
Seamus Heaney, Human Chain
Khaled Mattawa, translation of Adonis: Selected Poems from the Arabic written by Adonis
Philip Mosley, translation of The Book of the Snow from the French written by Francois Jacqmin

Judges:
Tim Lilburn
Colm Tóibín
Chase Twichell

Lifetime Recognition Award (presented by the Griffin trustees) to Yves Bonnefoy

Guest performer at awards ceremony: Jonathan Welstead, National Poetry In Voice recitation champion

2012
Canada:
Ken Babstock, Methodist Hatchet
Phil Hall, Killdeer
Jan Zwicky, Forge

International:
David Harsent, Night
Yusef Komunyakaa, The Chameleon Couch
Sean O'Brien, November
Joanna Trzeciak, translation from Polish of Sobbing Superpower: Selected Poems of Tadeusz Rózewicz

Judges:
Heather McHugh
David O'Meara
Fiona Sampson

Lifetime Recognition Award (presented by the Griffin trustees) to Seamus Heaney

Guest performer at awards ceremony: Alexander Gagliano, National Poetry In Voice recitation champion

2013
Canada:
David McFadden, What's the Score?
James Pollock, Sailing to Babylon
Ian Williams, Personals

International:
Fady Joudah, translation of The Straw Bird It Follows Me, and Other Poems from the Arabic written by Ghassan Zaqtan
Jennifer Maiden, Liquid Nitrogen
Alan Shapiro, Night of the Republic
Brenda Shaughnessy, Our Andromeda

Judges:
Suzanne Buffam
Mark Doty
Wang Ping

Guest performer at awards ceremony: Kyla Kane, National Poetry In Voice recitation champion

Guest speaker at awards ceremony: Pura López Colomé

2014
Canada:
Anne Carson, Red Doc>
Susan Goyette, Ocean
Anne Michaels, Correspondences

International:
Brenda Hillman, Seasonal Works with Letters on Fire
Rachael Boast, Pilgrim's Flower
Carl Phillips, Silverchest
Mira Rosenthal, translation of Colonies from the Polish written by Tomasz Rozycki

Judges:
Robert Bringhurst
Jo Shapcott
C.D. Wright

Lifetime Recognition Award (presented by the Griffin trustees) to Adelia Prado

Guest performer at awards ceremony: Khalil Mair, National Poetry In Voice recitation champion

Guest speaker at awards ceremony: August Kleinzahler

2015

Canada:
Jane Munro, Blue Sonoma
Shane Book, Congotronic
Russell Thornton, The Hundred Lives

International:
Michael Longley, The Stairwell
Eleanor Goodman, translation of Something Crosses My Mind from the Chinese written by Wang Xiaoni
Marek Kazmierski, translation of Finite Formulae & Theories of Chance from the Polish written by Wioletta Greg
Spencer Reece, The Road to Emmaus

Judges:
Tim Bowling
Fanny Howe
Piotr Sommer

Lifetime Recognition Award (presented by the Griffin trustees) to Derek Walcott

Guest performer at awards ceremony: Ayo Akinfenwa, National Poetry In Voice recitation champion

2016

Canada:
Liz Howard, Infinite Citizen of the Shaking Tent
Per Brask and Patrick Friesen, translation of Frayed Opus for Strings & Wind Instruments from the Danish written by Ulrikka S. Gernes
Soraya Peerbaye, Tell: poems for a girlhood

International:
Norman Dubie, The Quotations of Bone
Joy Harjo, Conflict Resolution for Holy Beings
Don Paterson, 40 Sonnets
Rowan Ricardo Phillips, Heaven

Judges:
Alice Oswald
Tracy K. Smith
Adam Sol

Lifetime Recognition Award (presented by the Griffin trustees) to Adam Zagajewski.

Guest performer at awards ceremony: Marie Foolchand, National Poetry In Voice recitation champion

2017

Canada:
Jordan Abel, Injun 
Hoa Nguyen, Violet Energy Ingots
Sandra Ridley, Silvija

International:
Alice Oswald, Falling Awake 
Jane Mead, World of Made and Unmade
Donald Nicholson-Smith, translation of In Praise of Defeat from the French written by Abdellatif Laabi
Denise Riley, Say Something Back

Judges:
Susan Goyette
Joan Naviyuk Kane
George Szirtes

Lifetime Recognition Award (presented by the Griffin trustees) to Frank Bidart.

Guest performer at awards ceremony: David White, National Poetry In Voice recitation finalist

2018

Canada:
Billy-Ray Belcourt, This Wound is a World
Aisha Sasha John, I have to live.
Donato Mancini, Same Diff

International:
Susan Howe, Debths
Tongo Eisen-Martin, Heaven is All Goodbyes
Layli Long Soldier, Whereas
Natalie Shapero, Hard Child

Judges:
Sarah Howe
Ben Lerner
Ian Williams

Lifetime Recognition Award (announced by the Griffin trustees) to Ana Blandiana.

Guest performer at awards ceremony: Hamish Marissen-Clark, National Poetry In Voice recitation champion

Guest speaker at awards ceremony: August Kleinzahler, 2004 Griffin Poetry Prize winner

2019

Canada:
Eve Joseph, Quarrels
Dionne Brand, The Blue Clerk
Sarah Tolmie, The Art of Dying

International:
Don Mee Choi, translation of Autobiography of Death from the Korean written by Kim Hyesoon
Raymond Antrobus, The Perseverance
Daniel Borzutzky, Lake Michigan
Ani Gjika, translation of Negative Space from the Albanian written by Luljeta Lleshanaku

Judges:
Ulrikka S. Gernes
Kim Maltman
Srikanth Reddy

Lifetime Recognition Award (announced by the Griffin trustees) to Nicole Brossard.

Guest performer at awards ceremony: Catricia Hiebert, National Poetry In Voice recitation champion

2020
Canada:
Kaie Kellough, Magnetic Equator
Chantal Gibson, How She Read
Doyali Islam, heft

International:
Sarah Riggs, translation of Time from the French written by Etel Adnan
Abigail Chabitnoy, How to Dress a Fish
Sharon Olds, Arias
Natalie Scenters-Zapico, Lima :: Limón

Judges:
Paula Meehan
Kei Miller
Hoa Nguyen

2021
Canada:
Canisia Lubrin, The Dyzgraphxst
Joseph A. Dandurand, The East Side of It All
Yusuf Saadi, Pluviophile

International:
Valzhyna Mort, Music for the Dead and Resurrected
Victoria Chang, Obit
Srikanth Reddy, Underworld Lit
Yi Lei (Tracy K. Smith and Changtai Bi, translators), My Name Will Grow Wide Like a Tree

Judges:
Ilya Kaminsky
Ales Steger
Souvankham Thammavongsa

2022
Canada:
 Tolu Oloruntoba, The Junta of Happenstance
David Bradford, Dream of No One But Myself
Liz Howard, Letters in a Bruised Cosmos

International:
 Douglas Kearney, Sho
Gemma Gorga, Late to the House of Words (tr. Sharon Dolin)
Natalka Bilotserkivets, Eccentric Days of Hope and Sorrow (tr. Ali Kinsella and Dzvinia Orlowsky)
Ed Roberson, Asked What Has Changed

Judges:
Adam Dickinson
Valzhyna Mort
Claudia Rankine

See also
Canadian poetry
List of poetry awards
List of years in poetry
List of years in literature

References

External links 
 
Griffin Poetry Prize on YouTube
Poetry In Voice/Les voix de la poésie website
Poets performing prose is the real prize Toronto Star
Griffin Poetry Prize doubles award money The Globe and Mail
Griffin Poetry Prize turns 10 Toronto Star

2000 establishments in Canada
Awards established in 2000
Canadian poetry awards